WHOG (1120 AM) is a radio station licensed to serve Hobson City, Alabama, United States.  The station is owned by Hobson City Broadcasting Company.

1120 AM is United States clear-channel frequency.

WHOG airs a "Smooth Soul and R&B" format to the Anniston, Alabama, area.

History
This station received its original construction permit from the Federal Communications Commission on May 1, 1987. The new station was assigned the call letters WHOX by the FCC on June 9, 1987. The station, while under construction, changed its call letters to WJOK on November 1, 1988, and again to the current WHOG call letters on December 28, 1990.  After several extensions to its construction permit, WHOG received its license to cover from the FCC on April 29, 1991.

References

External links
93.5 The Hog Facebook

HOG
Radio stations established in 1991
Urban adult contemporary radio stations in the United States
Mass media in Calhoun County, Alabama
1991 establishments in Alabama
HOG